In numerical analysis, Aitken's delta-squared process or Aitken extrapolation is a series acceleration method, used for accelerating the rate of convergence of a sequence. It is named after Alexander Aitken, who introduced this method in 1926. Its early form was known to Seki Kōwa (end of 17th century) and was found for rectification of the circle, i.e. the calculation of π. It is most useful for accelerating the convergence of a sequence that is converging linearly.

Definition
Given a sequence , one associates with this sequence the new sequence

which can, with improved numerical stability, also be written as

or equivalently as

where

and

for 

Obviously,  is ill-defined if  contains a zero element, or equivalently, if the sequence of first differences has a repeating term.

From a theoretical point of view, if that occurs only for a finite number of indices, one could easily agree to consider the sequence  restricted to indices   with a sufficiently large . From a practical point of view, one does in general rather consider only the first few terms of the sequence, which usually provide the needed precision. Moreover, when numerically computing the sequence, one has to take care to stop the computation when rounding errors in the denominator become too large, where the Δ² operation may cancel too many significant digits.

Properties
Aitken's delta-squared process is a method of acceleration of convergence, and a particular case of a nonlinear sequence transformation.

Which means that the distance between the sequence and its limit shrinks by nearly the same proportion on every step, and that rate of reduction becomes closer to being constant with every step. (This is also called "geometric convergence"; this form of convergence is common for power series.)

Aitken's method will accelerate the sequence  if 

 is not a linear operator, but a constant term drops out, viz:  if   is a constant.

Although the new process does not in general converge quadratically, it can be shown that for a fixed point process, that is, for an iterated function sequence  for some function  converging to a fixed point, the convergence is quadratic. In this case, the technique is known as Steffensen's method.

Empirically, the A-operation eliminates the "most important error term". One can check this by considering a sequence of the form , where :
The sequence  will then go to the limit like  goes to zero.

One can also show that if  goes to its limit  at a rate strictly greater than 1,  does not have a better rate of convergence. (In practice, one rarely has e.g. quadratic convergence which would mean over 30 resp. 100 correct decimal places after 5 resp. 7 iterations (starting with 1 correct digit); usually no acceleration is needed in that case.)

In practice,  converges much faster to the limit than  does, as demonstrated by the example calculations below.
Usually, it is much cheaper to calculate  (involving only calculation of differences, one multiplication and one division) than to calculate many more terms of the sequence . Care must be taken, however, to avoid introducing errors due to insufficient precision when calculating the differences in the numerator and denominator of the expression.

Example calculations

Starting with 

It is worth noting here that Aitken's method does not save two iteration steps; computation of the first three Ax values required the first five x values.  Also, the second Ax value is decidedly inferior to the 4th x value, mostly due to the fact that Aitken's process assumes linear, rather than quadratic, convergence.

Example 2: The value of  may be calculated as an infinite sum:

 

In this example, Aitken's method is applied to a sublinearly converging series, accelerating convergence considerably.  It is still sublinear, but much faster than the original convergence: the first Ax value, whose computation required the first three x values, is closer to the limit than the eighth x value.

Example pseudocode for Aitken extrapolation

The following is an example of using the Aitken extrapolation to help find the limit of the sequence  when given some initial  where the limit of this sequence is assumed to be a fixed point  (say ).

The Aitken extrapolates will be denoted by aitkenX. During the computation of the extrapolate, it is important to check if the denominator becomes too small, which could happen if we already have a large amount of accuracy; without this check, a large amount of error could be introduced by the division. This small number will be denoted by epsilon. Because the binary representation of the fixed point could be infinite (or at least too large to fit in the available memory), the calculation will stop once the approximation is within tolerance of the true value. 

%These choices depend on the problem being solved
x0 = 1                      %The initial value
f(x) = (1/2)*(x + 2/x)      %The function that finds the next element in the sequence
tolerance = 10^-10          %10 digit accuracy is desired
epsilon = 10^-16            %Do not divide by a number smaller than this

maxIterations = 20          %Do not allow the iterations to continue indefinitely
haveWeFoundSolution = false %Were we able to find the solution to within the desired tolerance? not yet

for i = 1 : maxIterations 
    x1 = f(x0)
    x2 = f(x1)

    if (x1 ~= x0)
        lambda = absoluteValue((x2 - x1)/(x1 - x0))  %OPTIONAL: Computes an approximation of |f'(fixedPoint)|, which is denoted by lambda
    end

    denominator = (x2 - x1) - (x1 - x0);

    if (absoluteValue(denominator) < epsilon)        %To avoid greatly increasing error, do not divide by too small of a number
        print('WARNING: denominator is too small')
        break;                                       %Leave the loop
    end

    aitkenX = x2 - ( (x2 - x1)^2 )/denominator
    
    if (absoluteValue(aitkenX - x2) < tolerance)     %If the value is within tolerance
        print("The fixed point is ", aitkenX))       %Display the result of the Aitken extrapolation
        haveWeFoundSolution = true
        break;                                       %Done, so leave the loop
    end

    x0 = aitkenX                                     %Update x0 to start again                  
end

if (haveWeFoundSolution == false)   %If we were not able to find a solution to within the desired tolerance
    print("Warning: Not able to find solution to within the desired tolerance of ", tolerance)
    print("The last computed extrapolate was ", aitkenX)
end

See also
 Rate of convergence
 Limit of a sequence
 Fixed point iteration
 Richardson extrapolation
 Sequence transformation
 Shanks transformation
 Steffensen's method

Notes

References
 William H. Press, et al., Numerical Recipes in C, (1987) Cambridge University Press,  (See section 5.1)
 Abramowitz and Stegun, Handbook of Mathematical Functions, section 3.9.7
 Kendall E. Atkinson, An Introduction to Numerical Analysis, (1989) John Wiley & Sons, Inc, 

Numerical analysis